Christopher Magiera (born May 30, 1983) is an American operatic baritone.

Early life and education 
Born in Evanston, Illinois, Magiera earned a bachelor's degree from Wake Forest University a master's degree from the Peabody Conservatory. He also attended the Yale School of Music and Bavarian State Opera Opernstudio.

Career 
Magiera was employed by Eytan Pessen as a member at the Semperoper in Dresden from 2010 to 2012.

He made his American operatic debut at the age of 26 in the title role of Eugene Onegin with the Opera Theatre of Saint Louis. Since then, Magiera has performed worldwide as a leading baritone, singing hundreds of performances throughout the world. He has been seen in the title roles of Eugene Onegin, Figaro (Il barbiere di Siviglia), Joseph De Rocher (Dead Man Walking) and Don Giovanni, as well as in the roles of Conte Almaviva (Le nozze di Figaro), Valentin (Faust), Marcello (La bohème), Papageno (Die Zauberflöte), Robert (Iolanta), The Captain (The Death of Klinghoffer), Sharpless (Madama Butterfly) ( and Zurga (The Pearl Fishers), among many others.

He has performed at renowned opera houses throughout the world including the Semperoper Dresden, Bayerische Staatsoper, Santa Fe Opera, Opera Theatre of St. Louis, Lyric Opera of Chicago, English National Opera, Teatro di San Carlo, Teatro Massimo Palermo, and Vancouver Opera, among others. In concert he has performed at the Knowlton Festival of the Orchestre Symphonique de Montreal, the Shanghai Symphony Orchestra, and with the Bilkent Symphony Orchestra of Ankara, Turkey, among others. Magiera has performed with conductors such as Kent Nagano, Riccardo Frizza, Vladimir Jurowski, Yu Long, Fabio Luisi and Emmanuel Villaume among others.

Awards
Magiera has received awards from numerous national and international competitions and organizations throughout his career, including those from:
 Metropolitan Opera National Council Auditions – National Grand Finalist, New England Region – First Place, Connecticut District – First Place
 Operalia – International Finalist
 Sullivan Foundation – Grand Prize
 Veronica Dunne International Vocal Competition
 Jensen Foundation 
 Gerda Lissner International Vocal Competition – 2nd Prize
 Liederkranz Foundation
 Bel Canto Foundation
 Licia Albanese Puccini Foundation
 Giulio Gari Foundation
 Anna Sosenko Assist Trust Fund
 Opera Birmingham Competition – First Prize
 Partners for the Arts Competition – First Prize
 Harlem Opera Theater – 2nd Prize
 Fort Worth Opera McCammon Competition
 Florida Grand Opera – YPO Competition – First Prize Junior Division
 Oratorio Society of New York – Johannes Somary Award
 Mario Lanza Institute
 Annie Wentz Prize

References 

Living people
1983 births
Singers from Illinois
Wake Forest University alumni
American operatic baritones
Yale School of Music alumni
Peabody Institute alumni
21st-century American singers
Classical musicians from Illinois
21st-century American male singers